Frank Joseph Kelley (December 31, 1924 – March 5, 2021) was an American politician who served as the 50th Attorney General of the U.S. state of Michigan. His 37-year term of office, from 1961 to 1999, made him both the youngest (36 years old) and oldest (74 years old) attorney general in the state's history, and led to his nickname as the "Eternal General".  He won ten consecutive terms of office. He was the longest serving state attorney general in United States history, until Tom Miller of Iowa surpassed his longevity record in 2019—although Kelley still holds the record for longest continuous tenure as an attorney general.  In 37 years of service as Michigan's chief law enforcement officer, he worked in concert with five Michigan governors.

He was cited by all 50 states attorneys general as being the attorney general who most furthered the cause of justice in the United States and was elected president of the National Association of Attorneys General, becoming the only Michigan attorney general so honored.  He was the first attorney general in the United States to establish Consumer Protection, Criminal Fraud and Environmental Protection Divisions.

Early life and education
Kelly was born in Detroit, Michigan, on December 31, 1924.  His father was a bar ("speakeasy")  owner and Democratic political appointee. He was an admirer of President Harry Truman, headed the Michigan delegation to the Democratic convention that nominated Truman, and is said to have inspired Kelley to go into public service.

He received undergraduate and law degrees (1951) from the University of Detroit. Before the construction of the Mackinac Bridge connecting the Upper Peninsula and Lower Peninsula of Michigan, car and train ferries crossed between Mackinaw City, Michigan, and St. Ignace.  Kelley worked as a merchant seaman on one of them.  He lied about his age to get the job.

Kelley became a lawyer in private practice in Alpena, Michigan, and later received an appointment as Alpena city attorney.

Attorney General of Michigan (1961-1999) 
Kelley was appointed Attorney General in 1961 by Governor John Swainson to fill a vacancy left when Paul L. Adams became a Justice of the Michigan Supreme Court. Kelley was elected in his own right as the Democratic nominee ten times before his retirement  from the position in 1999, when he was succeeded by the future Governor of Michigan Jennifer Granholm. Governor Granholm has publicly acknowledged Kelley to be one of her mentors and closest advisors.

He served successfully and surprisingly harmoniously alongside five governors.

Kelley was the first state attorney general to establish both a consumer protection and environmental protection division. He became nationally recognized in the area of consumer protection, appearing annually on the NBC show Dateline to discuss issues such as item pricing. He also gained statewide acclaim for battling utilities and insurance companies on rate increases. President Bill Clinton acknowledged Kelley as a leading force in the Tobacco Master Settlement Agreement, which resulted in most states receiving large multi-year payments to compensate them for the costs of tobacco-related illnesses.

He had many accomplishments as Attorney General:

He redirected the Attorney General's Office to concentrate efforts on "the public interest, especially on consumer protection and environmental issues".  The white-collar crime unit he created accused 62 Metro Detroit auto dealerships of price fixing.  And he also filed usury lawsuits against four big retailers.  He launched a consumer fraud hotline.  He issued attorney general opinions outlawing state prohibitions on price and brand-name alcohol advertising.
Kelley became a beacon to the state, and an advisor, inspiration and highly-valued mentor to many to notable public officials.

According to The Detroit News and the Associated Press, on a bipartisan basis, he fostered and worked with "allies in the legislative and executive branches" helping to pass model laws, including one of the first state consumer protection act, freedom of information act, and open meeting law.  The two latter laws opened up public administration transparency and accountability.
He facilitated raising of rural interstate freeway speed limits.
The department sued tobacco companies for recoupment of state Medicaid spending caused by smoking-related illnesses.  He played a pivotal role in achieving the Tobacco Master Settlement Agreement.
He was a consistent and effective opponent of highway advertising billboards, which he likened to an environmental disaster and eyesore.  A change in the state law occurred under his watch.
Through the Michigan Public Service Commission, he fought Consumers Power's Midland, Michigan, nuclear power plant as it drowned in cost overruns in the 1980s. The court battle scuttled the utility's plans to complete the plant and pass the costs on to rate paying consumers.
He was committed to environmental protection. The department continues to bear fruit, Attorney General Dana Nessel saidnoting that at least one environmental lawyer working on the PFAS lawsuit was hired by Kelley.  On January 14, 2020, he made a final public appearances at the Frank J. Kelley Library in a press conference in the G. Mennen Williams building where Nessel announced Michigan's lawsuit against 17 chemical companies accused of being responsible for PFOA and PFAA and PFAS contamination.
Two successor attorneys general opined that he helped establish benchmarks for public servant conduct.  He was characterized as "a giant in the American public service", who never forgot he was "the peoples' lawyer". The longtime Democrat joked that he lived in serene comfort on a Lansing lake "like a Republican".  Upon his death, tributes from politicians and lawyers were effusive.

He had a national impact and became president of the National Association of Attorneys General.  It honored him by creating and naming after him the Kelley–Wyman Award for outstanding service and national contributions by an attorney general.  He was elected president of the National Association of Attorneys General, the sole Michigan attorney general so honored.  All 50 states attorneys general said he typified the attorney general who most furthered the cause of justice in the United States. He was elected president of the National Association of Attorneys General, becoming the only Michigan attorney general so honored.  He was the first attorney general in the United States to establish Consumer Protection, Criminal Fraud and Environmental Protection Divisions.  His guidance led to the passage of Michigan's Open Meetings Act and Freedom of Information Act.

While Attorney General, Kelley ran for election to the U.S. Senate in 1972, but lost to incumbent Robert P. Griffin. He later credited the controversy over desegregation school busing and the weakness of Democratic presidential nominee George McGovern as major contributing factors in his 47–  53 percent loss.

His ten electoral successes were unequaled both in terms of duration and the magnitude of his victories.

Term limits
In 1993, the Michigan Constitution was amended to place term limits on many elected offices, including Attorney General. Kelley's successors are limited to two four-year terms in office. During the debate over term limits, some proponents of term limits pointed to Kelley and Michigan's then Secretary of State Richard H. Austin, who served from 1971 to 1995, as examples of elected officials who had stayed in office too long. However, they did not explain why, if that was true, voters kept re-electing Kelley, or why Austin was in fact finally defeated. Upon his retirement, Kelley was still eligible for one more term but said that while he was certain he could have won a final term, he wanted to leave on his terms "while he was still young and vital".

Later career 
After his departure from the Attorney General's office, Kelley founded Kelley Cawthorne, a prominent lobbying and law firm in Lansing, Michigan. In private practice he represented the late Marge Schott during the sale of her majority interest in the Cincinnati Reds Major League Baseball franchise. He also represented a host of major companies such as DTE Energy, Blue Cross & Blue Shield of Michigan, and Palace Sports & Entertainment/Detroit Pistons organization. He later sold the firm, but remained a consultant for it till the end of 2014.

In 1999, Governor John Engler named him to a seat on the Mackinac Island State Park Commission which controls 80% of the island. In 2007, Democratic Governor Jennifer Granholm named him chair of the Commission. As chair he replaced his business partner, Dennis O. Cawthorne, a former Republican Leader of the Michigan Legislature. Granholm also appointed Kelley to the State Ethics Board.

Kelley thought he was lucky"a political survivor ...  blessed with certain instinctual gifts, a way with people that enabled him to be elected class president seven times in school and attorney general 10 times afterward."

Blunders
As  Michigan's Constitution empowered the Attorney General to intervene statewide on behalf of the people, he chose to personally prosecute the alleged killers of Grady Little, a young black man attacked and knifed to death by a group of white men in the Palmer Park neighborhood in Detroit.  The Detroit Police Department investigated the matter and recommended issuance of an arrest warrant. Wayne County Prosecutor Samuel Olson refused the warrant.   He suffered political damage when the "trial, with an all-White jury, was a farce that taught the new attorney general a bitter lesson: Seeking justice doesn't necessarily mean it will be won." On the other hand, it established his bona fides in Detroit's black community.

In 1975, he went to Waterford Township to supervise an unsuccessful digging expedition for the corpse of Teamsters President Jimmy Hoffa.
He denied involvement with an alleged Southfield prostitute who had his name in a "$100-a-night" box file.
In 1972, Kelley acted on higher political aspirations, losing a Senate challenge to Republican Robert Griffin.

Kelley never aspired for the governorship, which position he deemed to be weaker than the attorney general.

Personal life and death

His wife, Nancy, died due to complications from a brain aneurysm in October 2015. Kelley had three children from his first marriage. In later life he wintered in Naples, Florida, and lived the rest of the year at his home in Haslett, Michigan. He died in March 2021 in a nursing home in Florida at the age of 96.  Kelley's remains are to be cremated and his ashes interred on Mackinac Island.  He is survived also by one grandson.

Legacy
The Michigan State University College of Law has established the Frank J. Kelley Institute of Ethics in his name.

In 1998, the State Bar of Michigan created the Frank J. Kelley Distinguished Public Service Award and named him its first recipient.  "This award recognizes extraordinary governmental service by a member of the State Bar of Michigan."

On October 24, 2013, the walkway in Lansing between the Michigan State Capitol and the Hall of Justice was named the Frank J. Kelley Walkway.  As Kelley himself stoically observed in 2013: "Most of this stuff is done posthumously.  I'm just lucky to have lived to the ripe old age."

In 2015, Wayne State University Press published his autobiography, titled The People's Lawyer: The Life and Times of Frank J. Kelley, the Nation's Longest Serving Attorney General. Kelley's co-author was syndicated political columnist Jack Lessenberry. Lessenberry wrote that Kelly began in "the rollicking days of Prohibition", and with inspiration from John, Bobby and Teddy Kennedy, "went on to essentially invent consumer and environmental protection in the state of Michigan", and "crusaded for civil rights and equal representation before it was popular to do so."

Michigan Governor Gretchen Whitmer ordered the lowering to half staff of U.S. and Michigan flags within the Michigan State Capitol Complex and on all public places in honor of his service.

References

Explanatory notes

Citations

General bibliography

External links
Michigan Bar Journal: "Michigan Lawyers in History—Frank J. Kelley: The Eternal General"
Kelley Cawthorne PLLC
Michigan Attorney General (official site)
The Political Graveyard

1924 births
2021 deaths
Michigan Attorneys General
Michigan Democrats
People from Alpena, Michigan
University of Detroit Mercy alumni